Rear Admiral Vennam Srinivas is an Indian Navy officer, currently serving as Flag Officer Maharashtra Area (FOMA).

References

Living people
Indian Navy admirals
Submariners
Flag Officers Submarines (India)
Year of birth missing (living people)
Recipients of the Nau Sena Medal